Sammarinese wine is wine from San Marino, which is home to a small but profitable wine industry. Being a small enclave within Italy, its wine industry is often overshadowed by its larger neighbour. The country produces a number of wines such as Brugneto and Tessano (cask-aged red wines) and Biancale and Roncale (still white wines).

References

External links 
 Consortium of Traditional Wines (Mostly in Italian)

Wine
Wine by country
Drugs in San Marino